The Shahar River, also known as Shahar Chay (City River) (Persian: شهرچایی, Kurdish: بەردە سوور) is a river in the Zagros Mountains of northwestern Iran.

The river rises in the Zagros Mountains  region along the Iran-Turkey bourder. It flows in an easterly direction through the city of Urmia and empties into lake Urmia on its western shore, near Keshtiban.

The river is impounded by Shaharchay Dam, located near Silvaneh and Rajan, Iran.

References

Rivers of Iran
Landforms of East Azerbaijan Province
Landforms of West Azerbaijan Province
Maragheh